Psellidotus is a genus of soldier flies in the family Stratiomyidae. There are at least forty described species in Psellidotus.

Species
These 48 species belong to the genus Psellidotus:

References

Further reading

External links

 
 

Stratiomyidae
Taxa named by Camillo Rondani